The Alang Ship Breaking Yard is claimed to be the world's largest ship breaking yard, responsible for dismantling a significant number of retired freight and cargo ships salvaged from around the world. It is located on the Gulf of Khambhat by the town of Alang, in the district of Bhavnagar in the state of Gujarat, India.

Since its establishment in 1983, the shipyard is believed to have acquired a total of USD$110.6 billion in aggregate value, including total assets. Its growth has prompted its extension northeast towards Sosiya in Gujarat, and it's now often referred to as the Alang-Sosiya Yard.

Salvaging 

The Alang facility consists of 183 ship breaking yards along  of coast that total 4.5 million Light Displacement Tonnage (LDT) of capacity.

Large super-tankers, car ferries, container ships, and a dwindling number of ocean liners are beached on the mud flats during high tide. As the tide recedes, manual labourers move onto the beach to dismantle each ship, salvaging what they can and reducing the rest to scrap.

The first ship broken down at Alang, MV Kota Tenjong, was beached on 13 February 1983. Alang's processing volume peaked between 2011 and 2012 at 415 vessels per year, and has been declining since. In 2020, Alang Ship Breaking Yard recycled 196 ships.

Ongoing upgrade plans 
The governments of Japan and Gujarat signed a Memorandum of Understanding in 2010, which focused on technology transfer and financial assistance from Japan to upgrade the yard's operations to meet international standards. The project aimed to make Alang the largest International Maritime Organization-compliant ship recycling yard in the world. This evolved as part of the Delhi-Mumbai Industrial Corridor, an international industrial development project supported by the governments of India and Japan and carried out as a public-private partnership.

Improvement efforts started in 2017, with the Japanese International Cooperation Agency providing a soft loan of $76 million and the Gujarati Maritime Board providing $35 million toward improvements.

Notable ships salvaged 
In 2004, the Regal V, famous for a deadly fire in 1990 when it was known as the Scandinavian Star, was broken up at Alang.

On 31 December 2005, the French aircraft carrier Clemenceau left Toulon to be dismantled in Alang, despite protests about improper disposal and mismanagement of toxic waste at the facility. In January 2006, the Supreme Court of India temporarily prohibited the Clemenceau from entering the port. Attempts to reach a settlement were unsuccessful, and Clemenceau was sent to a ship-breaking harbour in Britain instead. On 15 January, a court ruling by France's Conseil d'État ordered Clemenceau to return to French waters. Shortly after, Able UK, based at the Graythorp yard near Hartlepool, received a disassembly contract to use accepted practices in scrapping the ship. Disassembly began on 18 November 2009 and was completed by the end of 2010.

In December 2009, the longest ship ever built, Seawise Giant, was broken up at Alang.

Environment, health, and safety issues 
The salvage yards at Alang have generated controversies about numerous environmental, health, and safety issues, including working conditions, workers' living conditions, and environmental impact. The recycling activities pollute the beach and surrounding areas, including the water, with heavy metals.  Additionally, in the past, the nearest full-service hospital was 50 km (31 miles) away in Bhavnagar. In March 2019, the Alang Hospital, a multi-speciality hospital at Alang, was inaugurated by Vijay Rupani, the Chief Minister of Gujarat. This hospital was set up by the Gujarat Maritime Board, is operated by the Indian Red Cross Society, and is able to provide immediate medical services.

There are ongoing troubles often reported by local media regarding migrant workers' rights and discrimination by local owners or workers. Migrant workers' income is believed to be half that of laborers from nearby sites. According to news reports, there have been fatal accidents involving migrant workers, prompting various companies to destroy the employment records of such workers to avoid compensation dues. However, apart from these news reports, no formal evidence for such incidents exists.

Competition 
Other large facilities on the scale of Alang Ship Breaking Yard include the Aliağa Ship Breaking Yard (Turkey), Chittagong Ship Breaking Yard (Bangladesh) and Gadani ship-breaking yard (Pakistan). In the 1980s, Gadani was the largest ship breaking yard; however, competition from newly established yards such as Alang resulted in a significant reduction in output, with Gadani today producing less than one-fifth of the scrap it produced in the 1980s.

Documentaries 
2004: Shipbreakers is a documentary on the industry in Alang by Michael Kot.

2005: On the Road to Alang, by Peter Knego of Maritime Matters, is a documentary on passenger ships scrapped at Alang.

See also 
List of ship breaking yards

References 

Ship breaking
Ship disposal
Bhavnagar
Economy of India
Economy of Gujarat